Helle is a 1972 French film directed by Roger Vadim.

The film recorded admissions of 345,984 in France.

Plot
Helle is a mentally retarded, deaf and mute village girl who lives high in the Savoy mountains of France. She is taken advantage by the village people for her lack of understanding what's good and bad. Maria is a widow and has two sons, Julien and Fabrice. The eldest one, Julien is a war veteran and his time in Vietnam has broken him. Fabrice, the youngest one comes home to spend summer vacation and falls in love with Helle. Helle in her own ways feels for him and finds herself unable to communicate it. Maria who is ageing falls in love with a sleazy guy who cunningly takes her fancy car in the name of love, and he entertains her fancy over him. Julien tells Fabrice that Helle is village's traveling "filles de joie." This unsettles Fabrice and he beats Julien out from their shack and forces himself on her. Julien walking back home feels depressed and commits suicide by jumping from the top of Cascade Saint-Benoît. Next morning, Fabrice and Helle goes to his home and on the way he sees his mother lying on the field depressed that her lover has left her. Fabrice calls Helle to follow him but seeing his love and closeness to his mother, Helle sees herself as an outsider and goes to the church where she first fell in love with Fabrice and falls in a despair. However, hearing the church bell faintly she finds herself happy and plays around like a cow by mistaking it for a cowbell.

Cast

 Gwen Welles as Hellé
 Jean-Claude Bouillon as François de Marceau
 Didier Haudepin as Fabrice Fournier
 Maria Mauban as la mère de Fabrice
 Bruno Pradal as Julien Fournier
 Robert Hossein as Kleber
 Maria Schneider as Nicole
 Diane Vernon as Greta 
 Georges Poujouly  
 Dora Doll  
 Anna Prucnal

References

External links

1972 films
1972 drama films
French drama films
Films directed by Roger Vadim
Films scored by Philippe Sarde
Films set in 1951
1970s French-language films
1970s French films